Lycoperdopsis is a fungal genus in the family Agaricaceae. A monotypic genus, it contains the single gasteroid species Lycoperdopsis arcyrioides, described as new to science in 1900.

See also
 List of Agaricaceae genera
 List of Agaricales genera

References

Agaricaceae
Monotypic Agaricales genera